Imène El Ghazouani (born 9 June 2000) is a footballer who plays as a forward for Division 2 Féminine club GPSO 92 Issy. Born in France, she represents Morocco at international level.

Club career 
El Ghazouani has played for La Rochette Vaux le Pénil FC, VGA Saint-Maur and Yzeure in France.

International career
El Ghazouani made her senior debut for Morocco on 16 September 2021 as a 90+4th-minute substitution in a 1–0 win over Cameroon during the Aisha Buhari Cup.

See also
List of Morocco women's international footballers

References

External links 
 

2000 births
Living people
Citizens of Morocco through descent
Moroccan women's footballers
Women's association football forwards
Morocco women's international footballers
Sportspeople from Melun
French women's footballers
French sportspeople of Moroccan descent
Footballers from Seine-et-Marne